Charles Trench may refer to:
 Charles Chenevix Trench (1914–2003), Anglo-Indian army officer, historian and writer
 Charles Le Poer Trench (died 1839), Anglican archdeacon in Ireland